Elizabeth May Jones  (born 1946), best known as Liz Jones, is an Australian theatre director and artistic director of La Mama Theatre in Melbourne.

Career 
Jones graduated from the Australian National University (ANU) in 1965 with a Bachelor of Arts degree. In 1996 ANU conferred on her an honorary doctorate of laws.

Jones joined La Mama Theatre in 1973 as a performer and administrator and acted in a number of productions. She took over from Betty Burstall as artistic director in late 1976 and has remained in that role ever since. In 1985 in an effort to redress gender balance, she found six women directors to workshop plays, half of them by women.

She won a Churchill Fellowship in 1999, enabling her to observe the cultural significance of theatre in the United Kingdom, Ireland, Germany, France, Spain and the USA.

Since the fire that destroyed the La Mama Theatre in Carlton in May 2018, Jones has been involved in fundraising. The theatre was rebuilt and re-opened in late 2021.

Awards and recognition 
Jones won the Facilitator's Prize at the 2000 Sidney Myer Performing Arts Awards and was inducted onto the Victorian Honour Roll of Women in 2002.

Jones was made an Officer of the Order of Australia in the 2012 Queen's Birthday Honours for "distinguished service to the performing arts as an artistic director, administrator and performer, to the promotion of Indigenous playwrights and actors, and to the community".

Jones won the Australia Council Award for Theatre in 2018. She was presented with the Sue Nattrass Award for lifelong achievement at the 2019 Helpmann Awards.

Selected works

References

External links 

 Liz Jones: In Pursuit of Excellence – speech at the Wheeler Centre, 10 July 2014
Liz Jones and the fire at La Mama – with Richard Fidler, episode of Conservations on ABC Radio, 5 June 2019
Understanding 'Leadership that Liberates': Liz Jones and Leadership as Life/Work – biographical article by Julie Evans, University of Melbourne

1946 births
Living people
Officers of the Order of Australia
Australian theatre directors
Women theatre directors
Australian National University alumni